The Universidad Externado de Colombia (Externado University of Colombia) is a private university in Bogotá, Colombia. It has produced graduates including lawyers, academics, judges, financiers, journalists, as well as senior government officials and politicians. The institution grants 4 and 5 year professional degrees, as well as advanced Master and Doctoral degrees. Instruction is primarily in Spanish.

As well as being a member of the Unión de Universidades de América Latina, UDUAL, and the Asociación Internacional de Universidades, AIU., it is a founding member of the Asociación Colombiana de Universidades, ASCUN.

In 2005, UNESCO established a Chair in Human Rights, Violence, Public Policies and Governance,  at the university.

History 
It was founded on the 15 February 1886, by jurist and educator Nicolás Pinzón Warlosten, in answer to the educational restrictions imposed during "La Regeneración" which was a period when conservatives managed the government.  It gained full university status in 1958. Nicolás Pinzón Warlosten, who obtained help and aid from professors from the radical liberalism movement, and intellectuals from the body-social, formed an educational institution.

Admissions 
Its admission requirements are the Colombian bachiller (secondary school certificate) and the Examen de Estado  (the State Exams).  Furthermore, the SAT and/or ACT are recognized for American students wanting to transfer to the Universidad Externado.

Academics 
Programmes offered are:
Business Management
Tourism and Hotel Management
Educational Sciences
Social Sciences (Anthropology, Sociology, Psychology, Philosophy, Social Work, Geography and History)
Journalism
Public Accounting
Law
Economics
Cultural Heritage Studies (Museology, Archaeology and Restoration)
Finance and International Relations
Government and International Relations
Sociology
Anthropology
Social Work
Geography
Psychology
Philosophy
History

Accreditation of High Quality Education 
The Universidad Externado de Colombia obtained from the National Council of Accreditation of Colombia the accreditation of high quality for the university for eight years, the second highest available, as well as for programs such as: Law, Finance and International Relations, Government and International Relations, Accounting, Journalism, Economy, and Business Administration.

External links
Access map
Links with foreign institutions

 
Educational institutions established in 1886
Universities and colleges in Bogotá
1886 establishments in Colombia